The Medal Pro Petri Sede, also referred to as Castelfidardo Medal, was a decoration for military merit bestowed by the Holy See in the Second Italian War of Independence during the Italian unification.

History
The medal was instituted by Pope Pius IX on 12 November 1860 after the defeat of the Papal troops in the Battle of Castelfidardo. It was not limited to the Battle of Castelfidardo and given to the participants of the campaign.

Appearance
The decoration consists of a medal with an inverted cross - the Cross of Saint Peter - in the centre. The inscription is 

The medal is suspended from a red ribbon with two narrow white stripes edged in yellow. Medal bars were attached to the ribbon to indicate the different battles that each individual medal was awarded for.

It was issued in four classes:
 Enameled gold: For officers in command.
 Gold: For special acts of valor by commissioned officers.
 Silver: For commissioned officers.
 White metal: For non-commissioned officers and enlisted ranks.

References

 
Awards established in 1860
1860 establishments in the Papal States
1860 disestablishments in the Papal States